Polesine Parmense is a town in the Italian region Emilia-Romagna, located about  northwest of Bologna and about  northwest of Parma. It was an independent comune until 1 January 2016, when it merged with Zibello to form the new comune of Polesine Zibello.

Cities and towns in Emilia-Romagna